Moritz Stefaner is a German data visualization specialist. He is notable for his work for organisations like the OECD, the World Economic Forum, Skype, dpa, and Max Planck Research Society. Stefaner is a multiple winner of the Kantar Information is Beautiful awards. His data visualisation work has been exhibited at Venice Biennale of Architecture and Ars Electronica. He has contributed to Beautiful Visualisation published by Springer and was interviewed for the books New Challenges for Data Design published by Springer and Alberto Cairo's The Functional Art.

One of Stefaner's most widely known works is the visualisation of the OECD Better Life Index. Among other notable projects is his interactive installation On Broadway, his work for the FIFA, and his design of the new OECD data portal.

With Enrico Bertini, he produces Data Stories, a podcast on data visualization. Stefaner studied Cognitive Science (B.Sc., University of Osnabrück) and Interface Design (M.A., University of Applied Sciences Potsdam). He lives in Lilienthal, Germany.

Bibliography

References

Living people
German computer scientists
Information graphic designers
Scientific American people
Year of birth missing (living people)